Zduny  is a town in west-central Poland with 4,551 inhabitants as of 2011. It has been part of the Greater Poland Voivodeship since 1999; it was within Kalisz Voivodeship from 1975 to 1998.

Location 
Zduny lies in western part of Kalisz Upland, about 7 km from Krotoszyn and about 39 km from Ostrów Wielkopolski. The town has 2 major outside connections:

 national road 15: Trzebnica-Zduny-Krotoszyn-Gniezno-Inowrocław-Toruń-Brodnica-Ostróda,
 rail line Wrocław-Oleśnica-Zduny-Krotoszyn-Gniezno

Notable residents
Richard Friedrich Johannes Pfeiffer (1858–1945), German physician and bacteriologist

External links
Official town webpage

References 

Cities and towns in Greater Poland Voivodeship
Krotoszyn County